Amata goodii is a moth of the family Erebidae. It was described by William Jacob Holland in 1893. It is found in Republic of the Congo and Gabon.

References

 

goodii
Moths described in 1893
Moths of Africa